Andriy Bekh (also known as Andrei Bekh from , born 13 March 1983) is a Ukrainian former competitive pair skater. With Julia Beloglazova, he is the 2006 Ukrainian national champion and placed 18th at the 2006 Winter Olympics.

Programs 
(with Beloglazova)

Competitive highlights
GP: Grand Prix; JGP: Junior Grand Prix

With Beloglazova

References

External links 

 

1983 births
Living people
Ukrainian male pair skaters
Figure skaters at the 2006 Winter Olympics
Olympic figure skaters of Ukraine
Sportspeople from Odesa
Competitors at the 2005 Winter Universiade